Terence Dwight Parsons (1939-2022) was an American philosopher, specializing in philosophy of language and metaphysics. He was emeritus professor of philosophy at UCLA.

Life and career
Parsons was born in Endicott, New York and graduated from the University of Rochester with a BA in physics. He received his PhD from Stanford University in 1966. He was a full-time faculty member at the University of Illinois at Chicago from 1965 to 1972, at the University of Massachusetts at Amherst from 1972 to 1979, at the University of California at Irvine from 1979 to 2000, and at the University of California at Los Angeles from 2000 to 2012. In 2007, he was elected to the American Academy of Arts and Sciences.

Philosophical work

Parsons worked on the semantics of natural language to develop theories of truth and meaning for natural language similar to those devised for artificial languages by philosophical logicians. Heavily influenced by Alexius Meinong, he wrote Nonexistent Objects (1980), which dealt with possible world theory in order to defend the reality of nonexistent objects.

Works
 Nonexistent Objects, Yale University Press, 1980. 
 Events in the Semantics of English, MIT Press, 1990. 
 Indeterminate Identity, Oxford University Press, 2000.
 Articulating Medieval Logic, Oxford University Press, 2014.

See also

Round square copula

References

External links
 Parson's UCLA website

Living people
Analytic philosophers
Metaphysicians
Abstract object theory
1939 births
University of California, Los Angeles faculty
UCLA Philosophy
People from Endicott, New York
University of Rochester alumni
Stanford University alumni
University of Illinois Chicago faculty
University of Massachusetts Amherst faculty
University of California, Irvine faculty
Fellows of the American Academy of Arts and Sciences
Presidents of the American Philosophical Association